Sennoy Municipal Okrug is a municipal okrug of Admiralteysky District of the federal city of St. Petersburg, Russia. Population:  

It borders the Fontanka River in the south, Kryukov Canal in the west, Sadovaya Street and Voznesensky Avenue in the northwest, the Moyka River in the north, and Gorokhovaya Street in the east.

Places of interest include Hay Square, Garden Street, Griboyedov Canal, and the Yusupov Palace.

References

Admiralteysky District, Saint Petersburg